Kariz-e Now or Kariz Now or Kariz-i-Nau may refer to:
 Kariz-e Now, Fariman, Razavi Khorasan Province
 Kariz-e Now, Ordughesh, Nishapur County, Razavi Khorasan Province
 Kariz-e Now, Zeberkhan, Nishapur County, Razavi Khorasan Province
 Kariz-e Now, Nasrabad, Torbat-e Jam County, Razavi Khorasan Province
 Kariz Now, Salehabad, Torbat-e Jam County, Razavi Khorasan Province
 Kariz Now-e Sofla, Torbat-e Jam County, Razavi Khorasan Province
 Kariz-e Now, South Khorasan